Davídek is a Czech surname. Notable people include:

 Felix Maria Davídek (1921–1988) Czechoslovak bishop of the Roman Catholic Church
 Martin Davídek (born 1986), Czech ice hockey player
 Milan Davídek (born 1998), Czech ice hockey player

Czech-language surnames